Finder is a surname. Notable people with the surname include:

Alexandra Finder (born 1977), German actress
Jan Howard Finder (1939–2013), American academic administrator and writer
Joseph Finder (born 1958), American writer
Paweł Finder (1904–1944), Polish Communist